Ayeshehabad (also Romanized as ‘Āyeshehābād; also known as Chāhū, Chāḩū Gharbī, and Chāhū Qebleh) is a village in Dulab Rural District, Shahab District, Qeshm County, Hormozgan Province, Iran. At the 2006 census, its population was 77, in 18 families.

References 

Populated places in Qeshm County